Dingden is a railway station in Dingden, North Rhine-Westphalia, Germany. It is part of Hamminkeln.

The Station

The station is on the Bocholt-Wesel railway and is served by RB services operated by VIAS.

Train services
The following services currently call at Dingden:

References

DB Website 
Verkehrsgemeinschaft Niederrhein 
NIAG Website 

Railway stations in North Rhine-Westphalia